Kansas's 1st congressional district is a congressional district in the U.S. state of Kansas. Commonly known as "The Big First", the district encompasses all or part of 64 counties spanning more than half of the state, making it the seventh-largest district in the nation that does not cover an entire state.

Located within the district are Manhattan, Salina, Dodge City, Garden City, Hays, McPherson, Hutchinson and Lawrence. From 2011 to 2017, the district was represented by Republican Tim Huelskamp who was originally elected in 2010 to succeed fellow Republican Jerry Moran who ran successfully for the U.S. Senate seat formerly held by Sam Brownback. Huelskamp was re-elected twice in 2012 and 2014, but lost the 2016 Republican primary for a fourth term to obstetrician Roger Marshall.

Marshall won re-election in 2018, then was elected to the United States Senate in 2020. He was replaced in the House by former Lieutenant Governor Tracey Mann of Salina. Mann will become the first representative for the district to reside east of US Highway 281 since the district assumed its current configuration in the 88th Congress.

With a Cook Partisan Voting Index rating of R+18, it is the most Republican district in Kansas. Republicans dominate every level of government, often winning by over 65 percent of the vote on the occasion that they face any opposition at all. Since its creation in 1875, it has elected a Democrat once. In general, Riley County and Douglas County are the only counties in the district where Democrats are competitive, due to the sizable presence of the University of Kansas and Kansas State University. It covers two time zones (it includes all of Kansas's share of the Mountain Time Zone) and parts of three television markets (Topeka and Wichita, as well as Lincoln, Nebraska). Due to its size, its congressman usually becomes a statewide political figure. Proving this, since it assumed its present configuration in 1963, four of the district's former congressmen were later elected to the U.S. Senate: Bob Dole, Pat Roberts, Jerry Moran and Roger Marshall.

The district typically gives its congressmen very long tenures in Washington. From 1963 until 2011, it was held by just four members: Bob Dole, Keith Sebelius, Roberts and Moran.

History
Kansas had a single representative in the U.S. House of Representatives until after the 1870 U.S. Census, which showed that the state was entitled to three members of the lower branch of the national legislature. In 1872 three representatives-at-large were elected, but by the act of March 2, 1874, the legislature divided the state into three districts. The 1st congressional district was composed of the counties of Leavenworth, Doniphan, Brown, Nemaha, Marshall, Washington, Republic, Jewell, Smith, Phillips, Norton, Graham, Rooks, Osborne, Mitchell, Cloud, Clay, Ottawa, Ellis, Ellsworth, Russell, Saline, Dickinson, Lincoln, Riley, Pottawatomie, Jackson, Jefferson, Atchison, Davis (Geary), "and all that territory lying north of the second standard parallel."

No changes were made in until after the 1880 U.S. census, which gave the state seven representatives. On March 5, 1883, Governor George Washington Glick approved an act of the legislature which reduced the 1st congressional district to only include the counties of Nemaha, Brown, Doniphan, Pottawatomie, Jackson, Atchison, Jefferson and Leavenworth. The apportionment was amended by the act of March 13, 1897, which placed Shawnee County in the 1st congressional district and Pottawatomie County in the 4th congressional district.

Although the 1890 U.S. Census showed the population of Kansas to be large enough to entitle the state to eight representatives, no additional district was created until 1905. By the act of March 9, 1905, the state was divided into eight districts with the 1st congressional district being composed of the counties of Nemaha, Brown, Doniphan, Jackson, Atchison, Jefferson, Leavenworth and Shawnee.

The district's current configuration dates from the 1960 U.S. Census, when Kansas was reduced from six districts to five. The old 2nd congressional district was eliminated, and most of its territory was merged with the old 6th congressional district—represented by Bob Dole—to form the new 1st district. It has remained more or less the same since then, and has been considerably enlarged due to the state's population shifts to the eastern side of the state bordering Missouri.

The state's current districting dates from the 1990 U.S. Census, when Kansas was reduced from five districts to four. The current borders were established in 2012 by a panel of three federal judges, after the Kansas Legislature failed to pass new district maps.

Reapportionment in 2022 moved the entirety of Lawrence, home of one of the state's universities, The University of Kansas, from the 2nd congressional district to the 1st congressional district. Most of Jackson, all of Jefferson and the remaining part of Marshall counties moved from the 2nd congressional district to the district. The entirety of Marshall County is now in the district. The counties of Chase, Geary, Lyon, Marion, Morris and Wabaunsee all moved from the district to the 2nd congressional district. Also, more of Pawnee County moved to the 4th congressional district although the county still remains split.

Demographics

2000 census demographics
Following redistricting after the U.S. Census in 2000, there were 672,091 people, 260,490 households, and 177,858 families residing in the district. The racial makeup of the district is 89.02% White, 2.14% Black or African American, 0.95% Asian, 0.52% Native American, 0.05% Pacific Islander, 5.62% from other races, and 1.70% from two or more races. Hispanic or Latino of any race were 10.85% of the population.

There were 260,490 households, out of which 34.52% had children under the age of 18 living with them, 57.30% were married couples living together, 7.65% had a female householder with no husband present, and 31.72% were non-families. 27.58% of all households were made up of individuals, and 12.75% had someone living alone who was 65 years of age or older. The average household size was 2.49 and the average family size was 3.05.

In the district the population distribution by age was 26.46% under the age of 18, 9.50% from 18 to 24, 26.27% from 25 to 44, 21.41% from 45 to 64, and 16.36% who were 65 years of age or older.  The median age was 36.9 years. For every 100 females there were 98.60 males. For every 100 females age 18 and over, there were 95.80 males.

The median income for a household in the district is $34,869, and the median income for a family was $42,292. Males had a median income of $29,662 versus $20,851 for females. The per capita income for the district was $17,255. About 7.8% of families and 11.0% of the population were below the poverty line, including 13.4% of those under age 18 and 9.0% of those age 65 or over.

Among the population aged 16 years and older, 65.1% was in the civilian labor force and 0.4% were in the armed forces. Of the employed civilian workers, 16.3% were government workers and 11.4% were self-employed. Management, professional, and related occupations employed 29.4% of the work force and sales and office occupations an additional 23.4%. Only 2.7% were employed in farming, fishing, and forestry occupations. The largest employment by industry was: educational, health and social services, 22.7%; manufacturing, 13.8%; retail trade, 11.7%; and agriculture, forestry, fishing and hunting, and mining, 10.1%.

List of members representing the district

Election results from presidential races

Recent election results

2002

2004

2006

2008

2010

2012

2014

2016

2018

2020

2022

Historical district boundaries

See also

Kansas's congressional districts
 United States congressional delegations from Kansas
List of United States congressional districts

References

 Congressional Biographical Directory of the United States 1774–present

01